Kolesh Taleshan (also Romanized as Kolesh Ţāleshān; also known as Golshan Ţāleshān) is a village in Pasikhan Rural District, in the Central District of Rasht County, Gilan Province, Iran. At the 2006 census, its population was 192, in 52 families.

References 

Populated places in Rasht County